Theodoros Maniateas (19 March 1945 – 20 September 2014) was a Greek professional footballer who played as a goalkeeper.

Club career
Maniateas started his career at the age of 12 as a striker at Panthisaikos. The people of the club, realizing his football skills, relocated him to the position of goalkeeper. The agents of the big clubs did not take long to recognize the young talented goalkeeper and put him under surveillance. Olympiacos was the first club to invite him for a try out in a training match at Nea Smyrni Stadium, where he received flattering comments from the strikers of the red-whites, Giorgos Sideris and Aris Papazoglou, who recommended his immediate acquisition. In the summer of 1964, after the persistence of Tryfon Tzanetis, he was eventually acquired by AEK Athens as a third choice goalkeeper after Stelios Serafidis and Vangelis Petrakis. His co-existence with the other two goalkeepers did not leave him enough chances for participation. During his time at the club he got opportunities to participate in Cup matches against smaller clubs, as well as in friendly matches. In the summer of 1966, as part of the team's preparation for the upcoming season, AEK traveled to New York City where in a friendly tournament they faced the Santos of Pelé, Eusébio's Benfica and the expatriate Greek American. Maniateas played as a starter in the match against Santos and made a sensational appearance although AEK was ultimately defeated 1–0. His appearance caused Pelé to admire and bow to the face of the Greek goalkeeper, while the organizers awarded him a golden watch, a valuable possession by the standards of the time, for being the player of the tournament. A member of the squad that won second place in the Balkans Cup in 1967, losing only in the final by Fenerbahçe. He was a regular player in the team that reached the quarter-finals of the European Cup in 1969. During his spell at AEK, he won the Championship in 1968 season and the Cups in 1965.

In the summer of 1969, frustrated by his lack of participation, he clashed with the management and technical leadership of the team, resulting in his release from the club with the consent of the manager, Branko Stanković. Olympiacos immediately tried to signed him, but they eventually failed, after a financial disagreement. He continued to train with Olympiacos and to compete in friendly matches, until the summer of 1970 when he retired at the age of just 25.

International career
Maniateas shared with Vasilis Konstantinou the position of goalkeeper of the National Youth Team, where they played in the European Championship in 1964 and 1965.

Personal life
He was married with three children and regularly attended AEK and the team's Veterans Association events until 20 September 2014, when he died after a long battle with terminal illness.

Honours

AEK Athens
Alpha Ethniki: 1967–68
Greek Cup: 1965–66

References

Association football goalkeepers
1945 births
2014 deaths
Super League Greece players
AEK Athens F.C. players
Footballers from Athens
Greek footballers